Enver Shehu (24 January 1934 - 22 October 2009) was an Albanian football player and manager who played for and managed SK Tirana.

Playing career

Club
Shehu was joint-top goalscorer in the 1958 season, along with Partizani's Refik Resmja, both scoring 6 goals.

International
He made his debut for Albania in a September 1957 friendly match against China, his sole international appearance.

Managerial career
With 17 Nëntori, later Tirana, Shehu won three league titles and four domestic cups.

Honours
 as a manager
Albanian Superliga: 3
 1982, 1985, 1997

References

1934 births
2009 deaths
Footballers from Tirana
Albanian footballers
Association footballers not categorized by position
KF Tirana players
Kategoria Superiore players
Albanian football managers
KF Tirana managers
KF Teuta Durrës managers
Kategoria Superiore managers
Albania international footballers